Parliamentary elections were held in Gabon on 17 February and 3 March 1985. The country was a one-party state at the time, with the Gabonese Democratic Party as the sole legal party. The electoral system had been changed from the previous election, with it now taking place in two stages; firstly a primary election where a candidate and deputy were elected in each constituency, followed by a nationwide ballot on the proposed candidates. The number of elected seats was increased from 89 to 111, with the addition of nine members appointed by the President, one from each province.

Results

References

1985 in Gabon
Gabon
Elections in Gabon
One-party elections